National Revolutionary Party may refer to:

National Revolutionary Party of Afghanistan
Guatemalan National Revolutionary Unity
National Revolutionary Socialist Party of Kerala, India
Korean National Revolutionary Party:Nationalist party formed in 1935.Dissolved in 1947.
National Revolutionary Party (Mexico)
National Revolutionary Dividends Party or National Revolutionary Party of South Korea
National Revolutionary Party (South Korea, 2021):Far right, christian party that is led by pastor Jeon Kwang-hoon